Sold was a 1915 American silent drama film produced by Famous Players-Lasky and distributed by Paramount Pictures. Based on George Erastov's play of the same name (which was an adaptation of the Henri Bernstein French play Le Secret), the film starred stage actress Pauline Frederick and was directed by Hugh Ford and Edwin S. Porter. The film was re-released in 1919 by Paramount. It is now considered lost.

Cast
 Pauline Frederick - Helen
 Thomas Holding - Donald Bryant
 Julian L'Estrange - Robert Wainwright
 Lowell Sherman - Johnson
 Lucille Fursman - Lucy
 Russell Bassett -Dolbeare

See also
List of lost films

References

External links

Sold at silentera.com

1915 films
1915 drama films
Silent American drama films
American silent feature films
American black-and-white films
Famous Players-Lasky films
American films based on plays
Films directed by Hugh Ford
Films directed by Edwin S. Porter
Lost American films
Paramount Pictures films
1915 lost films
Lost drama films
1910s American films
1910s English-language films